Agoschema is a monotypic moth genus in the family Geometridae described by Prout in 1912. Its only species, Agoschema goniata, described by Warren in 1898, is known from New Guinea.

References

Geometrinae
Geometridae genera